Euclytia is a genus of bristle flies in the family Tachinidae. There is one described species in Euclytia, E. flava.

References

Further reading

 
 
 
 

Phasiinae
Articles created by Qbugbot